Air Lituanica was a Lithuanian airline headquartered in Vilnius and based at Vilnius Airport.

History 

Air Lituanica was registered in late . It was named after Lituanica, an aircraft commanded by Steponas Darius and Stasys Girenas, two pioneer Lithuanian pilots that flew it on a transatlantic flight in 1933. The carrier sole owner, Air Vilnius Group, had an initial investment of LTL0.5 million. Plans were to collect LTL43.5 million (EUR14 million) from a number of investors for the establishment of the new airline.

Air Lituanica launched ticket sales in early  using Estonian Air's booking channels. Also in early , the airline signed a contract for the lease through 2015 of an Embraer E-170 from Estonian Air. Air Lituanica thus became the first Lithuanian scheduled airline to operate since FlyLAL-Lithuanian Airlines and Star1 Airlines ceased operations in 2009 and 2010, respectively.

It filed for bankruptcy on 8 June 2015.

Destinations
Air Lituanica served the following destinations:

Fleet 
At  the Air Lituanica fleet consisted of a single Embraer 175.

See also
 Transportation in Lithuania

References

External links 

 

Defunct airlines of Lithuania
Airlines established in 2013
Airlines disestablished in 2015
Lithuanian companies established in 2013
Aviation in Vilnius
Companies based in Vilnius
2015 disestablishments in Lithuania